Barika is a city in Batna Province, in Eastern Algeria.

The city has a population of 144,547 (2005 estimates).

Demographics

Notes

Communes of Batna Province
Cities in Algeria